Yamagami, also written as Yamakami, may refer to:

People
 Mikihito Yamagami (山上幹臣, born 1987) Japanese mixed martial artist
 Tetsuya Yamagami (山上徹也), the suspect in the assassination of former prime minister Shinzo Abe

Mythological
 Yamagami Japanese Shinto mountain spirits

Fictional characters
 Yamagami Beast, a character from the Japanese TV show Space Sheriff Sharivan
 Captain Yamagami, a character from the 2005 Japanese film Deep Sea Monster Reigo
 Akio Yamagami (山神 燦緒), a character from the Japanese anime cartoon Sister Princess
 Itsuki Yamagami (山神 異月), a character from the Japanese manga comic and anime Corpse Princess
 Keiko Yamagami (山上 恵子), a character from the Japanese anime cartoon Tokio Private Police
 Mamimi Yamagami (山神 眞深美), a character from the Japanese anime cartoon Sister Princess
 Shuji Yamagami, a character from the Japanese video game Season of the Sakura

Places
 Yamagami (山上), Shiga, Japan; a village merged into Kanzaki District, Shiga
 Yamakami Domain (山上藩, Yamakami-han), a Fudai feudal domain under the Tokugawa shogunate of Edo period Japan

Facilities and structures
 Yamakami Castle Site, Kiryū, Gunma, Japan; see List of Historic Sites of Japan (Gunma)
 Yamagami Station, a former rail station superseded by Keihan-otsukyo Station
 Yamagami Dam (山神ダム), a gravity concrete & fill dam (compound) dam located in Fukuoka Prefecture in Japan

See also